K. Vasantha Bangera is an Indian Politician from the state of Karnataka. Bangera is a five term member of the Karnataka Legislative Assembly and represents the Belthangady constituency.

Political Party
Bangera has been a member of BJP, Janata Dal and Congress. Currently he is member of the Indian National Congress.

References 

Living people
Karnataka MLAs 2008–2013
Karnataka MLAs 2013–2018
Indian National Congress politicians from Karnataka
Bharatiya Janata Party politicians from Karnataka
Year of birth missing (living people)